Neosynchiropus is a small genus of Indo-Pacific dragonets. This genus is considered by some authorities to be a synonym of Synchiropus.

Species
There are three species classified as being members of the genus Neosynchiropus:

 Neosynchiropus bacescui Nalbant, 1979
 Neosynchiropus ijimae (Jordan & Thompson, 1914) (Japanese dragonet) 
 Neosynchiropus ocellatus (Pallas, 1770) (Ocellated dragonet)

References

 
Marine fish genera
Taxa named by Teodor T. Nalbant